Frank Seno (February 15, 1921 – March 31, 1974) was an American football running back and defensive back in the National Football League (NFL) for the Washington Redskins, the Chicago Cardinals, and the Boston Yanks.  He attended George Washington University.

External links
 Obit

1921 births
1974 deaths
People from Mendota, Illinois
American football running backs
American football defensive backs
George Washington Colonials football players
Washington Redskins players
Chicago Cardinals players
Boston Yanks players
Players of American football from Illinois